A bilingual search engine provides multiple language search pages when users type keyword in one language. This type of search engine gives more detailed information for people who speak more than one language, although many mainstream search engines provide multiple languages services. However, the difference between a bilingual search engine and a multiple language search engine is a bilingual search engine will translate keyword from one language to another automatically. Google also published a plug-in (Bilingual Search Suggestion) for Chrome browser to meet the requirement of bilingual search, but it was canceled and unable be found in Chrome web store now.

List of bilingual search engines 
sobotong.com
2lingual.com
konlap.com

Search engine software